David Dean Bottrell is an American actor, comedian and screenwriter best known for playing on numerous TV series & as Lincoln Meyer on 8 episodes of the ABC television series Boston Legal.  He is also the author of "Working Actor: Breaking In, Making a Living and Making a Life in the Fabulous Trenches of Show Business" published by Ten Speed Press, a division of Random House.

Known for his quirky characterizations, he started his career in New York, working at such theatres as the Second Stage, the Public Theater, the Manhattan Punch Line and regionally at the Long Wharf Theatre and the Actors Theatre of Louisville.  His television work includes guest starring roles on And the Band Played On, Head of the Class, JAG, Caroline in the City, Mad About You, Dharma & Greg, Days of Our Lives, Ugly Betty, Criminal Minds, iCarly, Castle, Bones, Harry's Law, NCIS, Justified, Mad Men, Longmire, Modern Family, Law & Order: SVU, Rectify and The Blacklist.

He also co-wrote (with Jessie Jones) the off-Broadway play Dearly Departed, which he and Jones later adapted into a film version titled Kingdom Come, starring Whoopi Goldberg, LL Cool J and Jada Pinkett Smith, produced by Fox Searchlight Pictures.

Bottrell has written about his experiences in the entertainment industry for the Huffington Post, Backstage, Salon.com and MetroSource magazine. His short film, Available Men premiered in the 2006 HBO Comedy Festival and went on to win 17 awards on the film festival circuit.  On stage, he was one of the original cast members of both the Los Angeles and New York companies of the long-running comedy revue, Streep Tease: An Evening of Meryl Streep Monologues performed by an All-Male Company in which he performed his critically acclaimed 6-minute rendition of the entire plot of Out of Africa.

In the summer of 2011, Bottrell (who is openly gay) performed his comedic one-man show, David Dean Bottrell Makes Love: A One-Man Show to sold-out houses at the Rogue Machine Theatre in Los Angeles.  In 2019, Bottrell brought a heavily revised version of the show to New York's Dixon Place and in January 2020, Penguin Random House Audio recorded a live version of the show, releasing it as an audiobook on 11 Feb. 2020.

Bottrell has taught acting at UCLA and The American Academy of Dramatic Arts (both the New York and Los Angeles campuses).  He is also one of the producers of Sci-Fest, the first annual Los Angeles Science Fiction One-Act Play Festival, held annually in May.

Filmography

Films

TV

References

External links
 

Living people
20th-century American male actors
People from Louisa, Kentucky
21st-century American male actors
American gay actors
Male actors from Kentucky
LGBT people from Kentucky
1959 births
21st-century American LGBT people
American gay writers
American LGBT comedians